The Indian Society of Oriental Art was an art society founded in Calcutta in 1907. It organised art exhibitions, taught students, and published high-quality reproductions and illustrated journals. founder by Abanindranath nath tagore

About the Society
Details of the Society were published in its Journal as follows in 1920:

Founding
The Society was founded by brothers Gaganendranath Tagore and Abanindranath Tagore in Calcutta in 1907. Following annual exhibitions of the Tagore School of Art, showing the latest works of artists in the new movement in Indian painting (initiated by Abanindranath Tagore, under the guidance of E.B. Havell) at the Government School of Art, Calcutta, the Indian Society of Oriental Art was founded in 1907, sponsored by a group of Europeans in Calcutta. The first officers were Lord Kitchener (President), Norman Blount and Abanindranath Tagore (Secretaries). Early members included Lord Kitchener, Mr Justice Woodroffe (John Woodroffe), Mr Justice Rampini (Robert Fulton Fulton), Mr Justice Holmwood (Herbert Holmwood), Mr Justice Ashutosh Chaudhuri, Mr Rueboson (Sweden), Mr Muller (Sweden), Norman Blount (jute broker), Maharaja Jagadindranath Roy of Natore, Maharajadhiraja Bijay Chand Mahtab of Burdwan, Mr J. Chaudhuri, and Mr Surendranath Tagore.

Presidents of the Indian Society of Oriental Art
 Lord Kitchener
 Mr Justice Woodroffe
 Lord Carmichael
 Maharajadhiraja of Burwan
 Sir Rajendranath Mukherjee
 Sir Charles Kesteven

School
A school was opened at 6 Samavaya Mansions, in the Hindusthan Insurance Building, Hogg Street, Calcutta. Students were taught by Nandalal Bose, Kshitindranath Mazumdar, Giridharilal of Orissa (sculpture), and supervised by Abanindranath and Gaganendranath Tagore. Students trained at the school included S. Venkatappa, Hakim Khan, Sami-uz-Zama, Roop Krishna, Pramodekumar Chattopadhyaya, Deviprasad Ray Chaudhuri, Bireswar Sen, Sailendranath De, Surendranath Kar, and Chanchalkumar Bandyopadhyaya.

Exhibitions
Annual exhibitions were held at Samavaya Mansions. They were not limited to Indian art, and there was a very popular exhibition of Japanese prints. The Society's exhibition in Paris in 1914 was the first exhibition of Indian Modern Art in Europe. The Society organised a Bauhaus exhibition in Calcutta in 1922.

Publications

Journal of the Indian Society of Oriental Art
First issued in 1933, the journal published articles and reviews, with high quality illustrations. The editors were Abanindranath Tagore and Stella Kramrisch. Contributors included K.P. Jayaswil, Percy Brown, G. Coedes, G. Yazdani, B.B. Dutt, Zoltan de Takacs, S. Krishnaswami Aiyangar, G.S. Dutt, P.V. Jagadisha Ayyar, Niharranjan Roy, Stella Kramrisch, Khitindra N. Mazumdar
 vol.15 (1947) - A.K. Coomaraswamy Special Commemoration Volume

Rupam
Described as "an illustrated quarterly journal of oriental art chiefly Indian", published from 1920 to 1930. Edited by O.C. Gangoly.

Further reading
 75th anniversary celebration Indian Society of Oriental Art : exhibition, 1983, 15th March to 27th March, 1983 at Birla Academy of Art and Culture (Calcutta: Birla Academy of Art and Culture, 1983) (OCoLC) 988775829
 Bittner, Regina and Kathrin Rhomberg (eds), The Bauhaus in Calcutta: an encounter of cosmopolitan avant-gardes (Ostfildern: Hatje Cantz, 2013) 
 O.C. Gangoly, "Indian Society of Oriental Art. Its Early Days", in Journal of the Indian Society of Oriental Art, Nov 1961.

References

External links
 Indian Society of Oriental Art on Worldcat
 Rupam on Worldcat

Indian art
Kolkata
1907 establishments in India
 Art schools in India
 Bombay School
Artists from Kolkata
Bauhaus
Art exhibitions in India